"My House" is a song by American rapper Warren G, featuring posthumous vocals from American singer Nate Dogg. was released on July 13, 2015 as the first single of his first EP Regulate... G Funk Era, Pt. II, with the record label G-Funk Entertainment. The song was produced by Warren G.

Music video
The music video was released on August 6, 2015.

Track listing 
Download digital
My House (featuring Nate Dogg) — 2:51

Release history

References

2015 singles
2015 songs
Nate Dogg songs
Warren G songs
G-funk songs